Cinchocaine (INN/BAN) or dibucaine (USAN) is an amide local anesthetic. Among the most potent and toxic of the long-acting local anesthetics, current use of cinchocaine is generally restricted to spinal and topical anesthesia. It is sold under the brand names Cincain, Nupercainal, Nupercaine and Sovcaine.

Medical use
Cinchocaine is the active ingredient in some topical hemorrhoid creams such as Proctosedyl. It is also a component of the veterinary drug Somulose, used for euthanasia of horses and cattle.

Physical properties
Cinchocaine is relatively insoluble in alkaline aqueous solutions.

See also
 Dibucaine number

References

Further reading
 
 
 
 

Local anesthetics
Quinolines
Phenol ethers
Carboxamides
Diethylamino compounds